Boris Ivanovich Kochelaev (born April 19, 1934) is a Soviet and Russian physicist and professor.

Biography
Kochelaev was born in Dirizhablestroy (now Dolgoprudny), USSR. He graduated from the Physics and Mathematics Faculty of the Kazan University in 1957. From 1957 to 1960, Kochelaev was a post-graduate student of the Experimental and Theoretical Physics Department of Kazan University under the supervision of Semen Altshuler. He defended his candidate's (Ph.D.) dissertation in 1960 in Kharkov State University, and his doctor's dissertation in 1968. From 1968 until now Boris Kochelaev is a professor and from 1973 to 2000 is a chair of Kazan University's Theoretical Physics Department.

He is an author of more than 150 scientific works. 33 PhD-level scientists were supervised by Kochelaev, 10 of them have obtained the Doctoral degrees and become full professors.

Research

The research interests are focused on electron spin resonance and spin dynamics in condensed matter, superconductivity, propagation of the sound in resonant media, and light scattering in solids.

Major research achievements:
 The development of spin-phonon interactions in paramagnetic crystals: 
 The non-linear theory of kinetic processes in paramagnetic crystals explained the experimentally observed phonon avalanche and super-scattering of light under saturation on the wing of the EPR line 
 The prediction of the discovered later effect of non-resonant sound absorption and its giant amplification by radio-frequency fields 
 The theory of EPR and spin relaxation in conventional superconductors with paramagnetic impurities 
 The theory of spin kinetics and magnetic resonance in usual and high-Tc superconductors and Kondo systems with heavy fermions.

These last theoretical investigations are best described by the Nobel Prize winner Prof. K. Alex Müller in the paper titled "The Impact of ESR (EPR) on the Understanding of the Cuprates and Their Superconductivity":

Honors and awards
Medal "For the Development of Virgin Lands" (1958)
Order of the Red Banner of Labour (1976)
Medal "Veteran of Labour" (1983)
Honored Worker of Science of TASSR (1984)
Honored Worker of Science of Russian Federation (2000)
Honored Professor of Kazan University (2004)
Order of Honour (Russia) (2005)
 State Prize of the Republic of Tatarstan in the field of science and technology (2007)
Order Order «For Merit to the Republic of Tatarstan» (2015)

References 

Personal page of B.I.Kochelaev on the website of Kazan Federal University

1934 births
Living people
People from Dolgoprudny
Kazan Federal University alumni
Academic staff of Kazan Federal University
National University of Kharkiv alumni
Honoured Scientists of the Russian Federation
Recipients of the Order of Honour (Russia)
Recipients of the Order of the Red Banner of Labour
Russian physicists
Soviet physicists